Jioji Vatubua is a Fijian rugby footballer who represented Fiji in rugby league at the 1995 World Cup.

Vatubua also played for Fiji in rugby union, playing in one test match in 1992.

References

Living people
Fijian rugby league players
Fiji national rugby league team players
Dual-code rugby internationals
Rugby union centres
Fijian rugby union players
Fiji international rugby union players
I-Taukei Fijian people
Year of birth missing (living people)